The Mercury Eight is an automobile that was marketed by the Mercury division of Ford between 1939 and 1951.  The debut model line of the Mercury division, Ford slotted the full-size Mercury Eight between the Ford Deluxe (later Custom) model lines and the Lincoln.  In total, Ford assembled three generations of the Eight (before and after World War II).    

During its production, the Eight offered a full range of body styles, including coupes, sedans, convertibles, and station wagons.  For its first generation, the Eight was produced with its own body, adapting its own version of a Ford body for its second generation; for the third generation, the Eight shared its body with the Lincoln.

For the 1952 model year, Ford expanded its namesake division to three nameplates and Lincoln and Mercury to two each, with Mercury replacing the Eight with Monterey (introduced in 1950 as a trim option), lasting until 1974.

First generation (1939–1940)

The advertisements for this car declared it to be "The car that truly dares to ask 'Why?, referring to the idea that a big car could not also be economical. The Mercury two-door sedan was listed at US$946 ($ in  dollars), several hundred dollars more than the 1937 Ford V-8, several hundred less than the Lincoln-Zephyr and about the same as the upper-range Oldsmobile and Dodges, Hudsons, and the lower-range Buicks and DeSotos, sales from all of which, it was hoped that customers would trade in their cars for the new Mercury. Its engine was a 95 hp version of the Ford flathead V8 engine, its styling was inspired by the Zephyr, and it had standard equipment hydraulic brakes using 12-inch drums. Double sun visors became standard in 1940.

Although "Eight" script would not appear on the front of the hood until the 1941 model year, sales literature prominently referred to the car as the "Mercury Eight" from the very beginning. This is no doubt because the actual series names, 99A in 1939 and 09A in 1940, were somewhat less enticing. A 1940 09A model has the words "Mercury Eight" in an emblem that runs from front to rear alongside the top hood lines on both sides.  It appears as chrome wording on top of a double red bar.

By the end of 1940 Mercury could run with the headline "It's made 150,000 owners change cars!"

Second generation (1941–1948)

The 1941 Mercury Eight got all-new styling and some engineering improvements. There were many chassis refinements, including improved spring lengths, rates, and deflections, plus changes in shackling, shocks, and an improved stabilizer bar, but the old fashioned transverse springs were still used. The new body featured door bottoms that flared out over the running boards, allowing for wider seats and interiors. The car had  more headroom, two-piece front fenders (three-piece at first), and more glass area. The front pillars were made slimmer and the windshield was widened, deepened, and angled more steeply. Parking lights were separate and set atop the fenders for greater visibility. Headlight bezels were redesigned. In all closed Mercurys the rear-quarter windows opened out. Front vent wings were now crank-operated, and in closed cars the ventilation wing support bars rolled down with the windows. The 4-door convertible, offered in 1940, was gone, but a station wagon was added. The woodie wagon's body behind the engine cowl was identical to Ford's, and produced at the company's Iron Mountain plant in Michigan's Upper Peninsula. The "Eight" script was moved to the rear of the hood. 90,556 Mercury Eights were sold in the 1941 model year.

In 1942 the Mercury Eight's slender bullet parking lights were replaced with rectangular units placed high on the fenders inboard of the headlights. Running boards were now completely concealed under flared door bottoms. The instrument panel now features two identical circles for speedometer and clock with gauges to the left of the speedometer, a glove compartment to the right of the clock, and a large radio speaker cover in the center. The grille looked more like that of the Lincoln-Zephyr and Continental. The "Eight" script was gone but an "8" appeared at the top of the grille center. Horsepower was increased to 100. Mercury's biggest engineering news for 1942 was "Liquamatic", Ford's first semiautomatic transmission. It wasn't much of a success and Mercury wouldn't have another automatic transmission until Merc-O-Matic appeared in 1951, which was a true automatic. Mercury production for the short 1942 model year totaled only 1,902. Output was halted in February 1942 as American auto plants were converted to the exclusive production of war material.

Although Mercury's prewar history was short, the Mercury Eight had already earned for itself the image of being a fine performer in mph as well as mpg, this "hot car" image quite in keeping with its name, chosen by Edsel Ford, that of the fleet-footed messenger of the gods of Roman mythology. The Mercury Eight was strongly identified as an upmarket Ford during this period. In 1945 the Lincoln-Mercury division would be established to change that.

A new grille was the most noticeable difference between the 1942 and 1946 Mercurys. It had thin vertical bars surrounded by a trim piece painted the same color as the car. An "Eight" script now appeared down its center. The Liquimatic automatic transmission option was eliminated. The most distinctive new Mercury was the Sportsman convertible. It featured wood body panels. Only 205 examples of it were produced and it was discontinued the following model year. Mercury Eight sales totaled 86,603.

Styling changes were slight in 1947. The Mercury name was placed on the side of the hood. Different hubcaps were used. The border around the grille was chrome plated. The "Eight" script still ran down its center. There was also new trunk trim. More chrome was used on the interior and the dash dial faces were redesigned. The convertible and station wagon came with leather upholstery. The other body styles used fabric. The wood paneled Sportsman convertible was gone. 86,363 Mercury Eights were sold.

For all practical purposes the 1948 Mercury Eights were identical to the 1947s. The major changes consisted of different dial faces and no steering column lock. 50,268 Mercury Eights were sold.

Australian coupe utility and panel van variants
A unique coupe utility variant of the Mercury was produced in Australia from 1946 to 1948. Marketed as the Mercury Club Coupe Utility, it was built on a 118-inch wheelbase and had a carrying capacity rated at 10–12 cwt. The 1946 version was coded as the Model S9A and the 1947 and 1948 variants as the Model 6M. 

A panel van model was also offered.

Third generation (1949–1951)

For 1949, Mercury introduced its first postwar model line. The first Mercury of the combined Lincoln-Mercury Division, the Mercury Eight now shared its body with the Lincoln (instead of the Ford). Keeping its 118-inch wheelbase, the Mercury was sized between its two divisional counterparts. In place of the updated prewar body, Mercury adopted a "pontoon" body, ending the use of running boards entirely, along with separate fenders. The 239 Flathead V8 was carried over, producing more power than in its Ford counterpart. 

In a change to the model line, the four-door station wagon was replaced by a two-door model; the design of the wagon body structure had shifted to steel, relegating wood to body paneling (still manufactured at the Ford Iron Mountain Plant). An 8 tube AM radio was introduced as an option; full instrumentation was added to the dashboard. A new overdrive system was optional, activated by a handle under the dash.

The shift of the Mercury to the Lincoln body proved successful; alongside its Ford counterpart, Mercury broke sales records for 1949.   

For 1950, the Monterey name made its first appearance, as Mercury introduced a high-end two-door coupe, similar to the Ford Crestliner, Lincoln Lido, and Lincoln Cosmopolitan Capri; the Monterey was intended to compete against the two-door hardtop coupes introduced by General Motors in 1949.  The front suspension was independent with stabilizer bars. 

For 1952, as Mercury redesigned its model line, the Monterey was established as a stand-alone nameplate, with Mercury renaming the Eight as the Mercury Custom.

Custom car legacy 

Within its era and beyond, the third-generation Mercury Eight was popular with customizers. In 1949, Sam Barris built the first lead sled from a 1949 Mercury Eight; the Eight became the definitive "lead sled", much as the Ford V-8 (as the "deuce") was becoming the definitive hot rod. The Eights were among the first models to receive an aftermarket OHV engine swap, since Oldsmobile and Cadillac developed the first high-compression OHV V8 engines in 1949, whereas Ford was still using a sidevalve engine. 

Sam and George Barris also used the 1949 body style to build "the most famous custom car ever", the Hirohata Merc, for customer Bob Hirohata in 1953. Setting a style and an attitude, it had a "momentous effect" on custom car builders, appeared in several magazines at the time, and reappeared numerous times since, earning an honorable mention on Rod & Customs "Twenty Best of All Time" list in 1991. 

The Eight remains a very popular subject for car modellers. In 1990, Mattel Hot Wheels created a model of 1949 Mercury with a chopped top. It is called Purple Passion. Fiberglass replicas of the Eight, inspired by Sam Barris's car, are still in production and are popular with custom and rod enthusiasts.

See also
Appleton spotlights
Rat rod
Leadsled
Lowrider

References

External links

 The George Barris website, which featured the first chopped 1949 Mercury (among others).
 Custom cars

Eight
Convertibles
Coupés
Sedans
Station wagons
Police vehicles
Kustom Kulture
First car made by manufacturer
Cars introduced in 1939
1940s cars
1950s cars
Pre-war vehicles